Andrej Poljanec (born 10 November 1984) is a Slovenian track & field athlete who specializes in the pole vault.

He was born in Ljubljana. He finished eleventh at the 2001 World Youth Championships. He also competed at the 2007 European Indoor Championships and the 2007 World Championships without reaching the final round.

His personal best jump is 5.60 metres, achieved in June 2007 in Novo Mesto.

Competition record

References

1984 births
Living people
Sportspeople from Ljubljana
Slovenian male pole vaulters
World Athletics Championships athletes for Slovenia
Competitors at the 2007 Summer Universiade
Competitors at the 2009 Summer Universiade
Competitors at the 2011 Summer Universiade
Athletes (track and field) at the 2005 Mediterranean Games
Mediterranean Games competitors for Slovenia